Doreen Maude Kartinyeri (3 February 1935–2 December 2007) was an Ngarrindjeri elder and historian, born in the Australian state of South Australia. She played a key role in the Hindmarsh Bridge controversy and made many contributions to Indigenous activism.

Early life

Kartinyeri was born on 3 February 1935, in the Aboriginal reserve at Point MacLeay (now Raukkan) in South Australia, to parents Thelma Kartinyeri and Oswald (Oscar) Kartinyeri. She had two sisters, Doris and Nancy, and one brother, Ron. However, Doris was the only sibling with whom Kartinyeri maintained contact, as Ron was in prison and Nancy died on the operating table when having a tonsillectomy.

Kartinyeri struggled with authority for most of her life, beginning when she was a child, after her mother died. Kartinyeri and her newborn sister, Doris, were placed in different childcare institutions. In an interview on ABC radio in 2007, Kartinyeri discussed this experience, saying: “I said I want to know where Doris is, what did you do with her, she's not in the home, someone took her. I didn't really know where she was, we didn't, I was only 13, just turned 13”. As the interview continued, Kartinyeri continued to reveal her passionate, stubborn and argumentative nature, describing herself as “a fiery girl who talked too much”. She mentioned a particular time when she was trying to see her sister, Doris. “All right,” Kartinyeri said, “so I just kicked my shoes off, climbed the top of the wall, and said, ‘if you don't tell me I'm going to jump,’ so she told me where Doris was".

Education
Kartinyeri’s education began in her hometown, at the Raukkan Mission School. Kartinyeri said that she did not like her teacher at this school because he was “too strict”. After the death of her mother, Kartinyeri was, unwillingly, moved to the Salvation Army Home in Fullarton, on the condition that she would stay with her sister, Doris. Coincidentally, this was a lie - Doris did not go with Kartinyeri to Fullarton, but was instead sent to the Colebrook Home at Eden Hills. Kartinyeri said that the conditions of this institution were “military style”, claiming that she was beaten on her first night for swearing. Kartinyeri did not do well in school - she was rebellious, was punished often, performed poorly, often did not do work, and when she did, teachers accused her of cheating. During her time at school, Kartinyeri found enjoyment in going to the pool and seeing boys. Often Kartinyeri would get into mischief with the other nunga (Aboriginal) girls, and Kartinyeri claimed that they were often the scapegoats for the white girls (herself especially). Later on, Kartinyeri was expelled for getting into a fight with girls who were bullying a disabled girl. From there, she never continued her formal education but she did go on to win many honorary academic awards and has since received much praise for her academic work.

Domestic employment
After being expelled from Fullarton in 1949, Kartinyeri believed she was being sent back home to Raukkan; however, to her surprise she was sent to Joan and George Dunn's house in the Adelaide Hills to work as a domestic servant for the next two years. After the initial shock had subdued, Kartinyeri settled well into life at Adelaide Hills and came to love and respect Joan and George.

After her two years with the Dunns were complete, Kartinyeri was offered another position, working for the Motterams, who lived in the Adelaide suburb of Kings Park. Having known the Motterams as friends of the Dunns and liking them, she accepted the job. While working there, Kartinyeri did few physical or taxing tasks, describing her main purpose as keeping Mrs Motterham company which was easy because she had a “good sense of humour and was very easy going.”

At the age of 15, Kartinyeri returned to Raukkan to care for her sick grandmother. She took up a position as a domestic servant for the superintendent of the mission, where her small wages went to supporting her grandparents who weren't entitled to a pension because of their indigenous status.

At the age of 16, Kartinyeri had her first experience as a full-time foster mother, taking care of her cousins and her cousin's children. Finding motherhood exhausting, Kartinyeri went back to working domestically, taking a job at the Maitland Hotel. Deciding that caring for grandmother back home was too stressful, Kartinyeri left Raukkan and took up work sorting grapes at Barmera.

Hindmarsh Bridge
Doreen played a significant and controversial role in the Hindmarsh Island Bridge Affair in the 1990s. All of her prior research sparked her passionate and argumentative side in 1993, when the South Australian State Government put forward a proposal to build a bridge between Hindmarsh Island and Goolwa. Doreen quickly became a key figure in the movement against this proposal, saying that Hindmarsh Island was sacred land, particularly for Indigenous women, for reasons which her and her group would not disclose. In early 1994, Doreen's group were successful in their application to the Federal Government to gain a heritage order to prohibit the bridge being built. However, in 1995, the Royal Commission conducted an investigation into Doreen's movement and concluded that their “indigenous women” argument was fabricated. In addition, several Ngarrindjeri (the women native to Hindmarsh Island), said that they knew nothing of the spiritual importance that Doreen was talking about. Furthermore, in March 1996, the Howard Government re-approved the plans for the bridge and in the year 2000, it was built. During this time, there was much debate and discussion as to whether Doreen and her group were telling the truth or not. Doreen always maintained her passion and that what she was saying was true and as a result, she bore the brunt of the criticism and debate.

Finally, in 2010, the South Australian government recognised the honesty of Doreen and her group, formally acknowledging that "women members of the Ngarrindjeri traditional owners were genuine in the mid-1990s when they said that the construction of the bridge would violate their most sacred beliefs." Years later, in an interview on ABC radio with Mike Sexton in 2007, Doreen described her position on this ordeal, saying: "If I was a destructive person I would have went and blown it up, and that's the truth. I would have went and blown it up, but I hate destroying things." Mike Sexton went on to say that "She was defiant to the end. A decade after the phrase 'secret women's business' entered the Australian vernacular, Doreen Kartinyeri maintained her rage against the bridge at Hindmarsh Island."

Family

Relationship with parents
Her mother Thelma Kartinyeri was classified as a 'quarter caste' Aboriginal woman. She was highly religious and wove baskets, knitted, crocheted and made clothes out of rags.

Thelma continued to help people and soon became a member of the Red Cross where she cooked food and sent it to needy families. Her youngest daughter died on the operating table whilst she was getting her tonsils taken out. Soon after this occurred, she had another daughter named Doris. Thelma died within a month of giving birth, due to complications following the birth. Doreen was only ten at the time, and had described the early death as one of the most traumatic experiences of her life.

Both mother and father had spent their days at Raukkan. Under the official classificatory system, Oswald (Oscar) Kartinyeri was considered as a 'full blood' Aboriginal. After the death of Thelma, the police took custody of Doris. He was described to be 'beside himself'. Doreen recalled her father travelling to Victoria to search for her. She also claimed that when he finally returned he was tired and dirty. As he grew old, Doreen and Terry had brought him up to live with them in Point Pearce. Oscar died in 1979 of a heart attack.

Marriage
Doreen married and had children with Terry Wanganeen, first meeting at Pearce Point when Doreen was visiting her Aunt Rose. Doreen became pregnant in 1954, leading to the decision for her and Terry to get married and move to Point Pearce together. Her relationship with Terry, who was heavily reliant on alcohol, and very violent and abusive when under the influence, was unstable. Both parties were hostile to one another, and their marriage was often unhappy. There was one particular instance when Terry threw a leg of lamb at the door because it was under-cooked, causing Doreen to become so angry that she broke a glass bottle and stabbed him in retaliation. Upon arrival to the hospital, authorities gave Doreen two choices for her consequence: she could either plead guilty to attempted murder or spend six weeks in a psychiatric hospital. She chose to be admitted into psychiatric care. When she returned, Terry's attitude had drastically changed. However, Doreen still came to the conclusion that their marriage was effectively over, and she moved to Adelaide.

Children
Doreen became a full-time foster mother for her cousins at the age of 16. She also took care of her cousins’ children whilst she was pregnant. She described this experience as exhausting. She fell pregnant in 1954 and gave birth to a boy later that year in December. Her baby had died from an unknown illness at 7 months. She described his death as “one of the most traumatic experiences” in her life, the other being the early death of her mother. During baby Terry's death, she fell pregnant again. Due to the death of her first born, she was terrified at the loss of another baby, so she considered inducing a miscarriage. From 1955 to 1699, she had given birth to six more sons and two daughters. She described the birth of her children as the “best thing that ever happened”.

Projects
She was living in Point Pierce with her family when she started to examine the histories and genealogies of the indigenous people in the Point Pierce and Point MacLeay area (and she discovered that most Aboriginals in this area were lost during colonisation. From this research, Doreen went on to write and successfully publish several books on the Indigenous people of this area, which led to her being awarded an honorary doctorate from the University of Adelaide and given a job offer from the South Australian museum in their Aboriginal Family History Unit.

Awards
In 1994, Doreen was named the South Australian Aboriginal of Year, and a year later she was awarded an Honorary Doctorate from the University of South Australia in recognition of her genealogical work.

Death
Kartinyeri died in the early morning hours of 2 December 2007, after battling stomach cancer and other illnesses. She was 72.

References

External links
 

1935 births
2007 deaths
20th-century Australian historians
Australian women historians
Australian indigenous rights activists
Women human rights activists
20th-century Australian women